Lars Faaborg-Andersen was a Danish diplomat who served as ambassador of the European Union (EU) to Israel from 2013 until 2017.

Faaborg-Andersen has a Master of International Affairs from Columbia University in 1982 and a master's degree in political science (Cand.adm.pol) from the University of Copenhagen in 1984.

He joined the Danish Foreign Ministry in 1984. In the period 1994–1998 he served as deputy leader of the Danish embassy in Pretoria, South Africa. He was deputy leader of the Foreign Ministry's Department for Asian affairs 1998–2000 before heading the Ministry's Department for Middle East and Latin-American affairs 2000–2003. When leading the Middle East Department Denmark held the presidency of the Council of the EU July–December 2002 and Faaborg-Andersen co-authored the Road map for peace.

In the period 2003–2008, Faaborg-Andersen was Denmark's deputy permanent representative to the United Nations in New York and in the period 2005–2006 also to the Security Council. He went on to serve as Danish ambassador to the Political and Security Committee of EU in Brussels in 2008 and held the position until he in 2013 was appointed ambassador to Israel for the EU by Catherine Ashton.

References

Living people
Danish civil servants
Permanent Representatives of Denmark to the United Nations
Ambassadors of the European Union to Israel
School of International and Public Affairs, Columbia University alumni
University of Copenhagen alumni
Year of birth missing (living people)
Danish officials of the European Union